Leptoceratops (meaning 'Thin-horned face' and derived from Greek lepto-/λεπτο- meaning 'small', 'insignificant', 'slender', 'meagre' or 'lean', kerat-/κερατ- meaning 'horn' and -ops/ωψ meaning face), is a genus of leptoceratopsid ceratopsian dinosaurs from the late Cretaceous Period (late Maastrichtian age, 68.8-66 Ma ago) of what is now Western North America. Their skulls have been found in Alberta, Canada and  Wyoming.

Description
 
Leptoceratops could probably stand and run on their hind legs: analysis of forelimb function indicates that even though they could not pronate their hands, they could walk on four legs.

Discovery and species
 
The first small ceratopsian named Leptoceratops was discovered in 1910 by Barnum Brown in the Red Deer Valley in Alberta, Canada. He described it four years later. The first specimen had a part of its skull missing, but there were later well-preserved finds by C. M. Sternberg in 1947, including one complete fossil. Later material was found in 1978 in the Bighorn Basin of northern Wyoming.

The type species is Leptoceratops gracilis. In 1942, material collected in Montana was named Leptoceratops cerorhynchos, but this was later renamed Montanoceratops.

Classification
Leptoceratops belonged to the Ceratopsia, a group of herbivorous dinosaurs with parrot-like beaks that thrived in North America and Asia during the Cretaceous Period. Although traditionally allied with the Protoceratopsidae, it is now placed in its own family, Leptoceratopsidae, along with dinosaurs such as Udanoceratops and Prenoceratops. The relationships of Leptoceratops to ceratopsids are not entirely clear. Although most studies suggest that they lie outside the protoceratopsids and ceratopsids, some studies suggest that they may be allied with Ceratopsidae. The absence of premaxillary teeth is one feature that supports this arrangement.

Paleobiology

Behavior 
In 2019, fossils from the Hell Creek Formation found three fossil bone beds which revealed that not only was Leptoceratops a social animal, but also raised its young in burrows.

Diet

Leptoceratops, like other ceratopsians, would have been a herbivore. The jaws were relatively short and deep, and the jaw muscles would have inserted over the large parietosquamosal frill, giving Leptoceratops a powerful bite. The teeth are unusual in that the dentary teeth have dual wear facets, with a vertical wear facet where the maxillary teeth sheared past the crown, and a horizontal wear facet where the maxillary teeth crushed against the dentary teeth. This shows that Leptoceratops chewed with a combination of shearing and crushing. Between the shearing/crushing action of the teeth and the powerful jaws, Leptoceratops was probably able to chew extremely tough plant matter. Given its small size and quadrupedal stance, Leptoceratops would have been a low feeder. Flowering plants, also known as angiosperms, were the most diverse plants of the day, although ferns, cycads and conifers may still have been more common in terms of numbers. A 2016 study revealed that Leptoceratops was able to chew its food much like several groups of mammals, which meant that it had a diet that consisted of tough, fibrous plant material.

See also

 Timeline of ceratopsian research

References
 B. Brown. 1914. Leptoceratops, a new genus of Ceratopsia from the Edmonton Cretaceous of Alberta. Bulletin of the American Museum of Natural History 33(36):567-580

Sources
 

Leptoceratopsids
Late Cretaceous dinosaurs of North America
Fossil taxa described in 1914
Taxa named by Barnum Brown
Lance fauna
Hell Creek fauna
Scollard fauna
Paleontology in Alberta
Paleontology in Wyoming
Maastrichtian genus first appearances
Maastrichtian genus extinctions
Ornithischian genera